Harry Roy Trekell (November 18, 1892 – November 4, 1965) was a pitcher in Major League Baseball. He played for the St. Louis Cardinals in 1913.

References

External links

1892 births
1965 deaths
Major League Baseball pitchers
St. Louis Cardinals players
Baseball players from Illinois
Missoula (minor league baseball) players
Spokane Indians players